Dănuţ "Dan" Grecu (born 26 September 1950) is a retired Romanian artistic gymnast who specialized in rings. In 1974 he became Romania’s first world champion in artistic gymnastics and was named Romanian Athlete of the Year. Grecu competed at the 1972, 1976 and 1980 Olympics and won a bronze medal in 1976; he had to withdraw from the 1980 Olympics due to a muscle tear sustained on the rings. In addition to his 1974 gold medal he won two world and two European medals on the rings. He retired due to injuries to his shoulder and biceps sustained in training while preparing to the 1980 Olympics.

Grecu was one of five siblings of a border guard officer. At the age of 12 he took up gymnastics because he loved climbing anything hanging around, like ropes and tree branches. After retiring from competitions Grecu had a long career as gymnastics coach with the national team. Grecu is married to a fellow gymnastics coach Elena Grecu. They have two children: daughter Simona and son Bogdan.

References

External links 

  
 
 
 
 

1950 births
Living people
Gymnasts from Bucharest
Gymnasts at the 1972 Summer Olympics
Gymnasts at the 1976 Summer Olympics
Gymnasts at the 1980 Summer Olympics
Romanian male artistic gymnasts
Olympic gymnasts of Romania
Olympic bronze medalists for Romania
Medalists at the World Artistic Gymnastics Championships
World champion gymnasts
European champions in gymnastics
Romanian gymnastics coaches
Olympic medalists in gymnastics
Medalists at the 1976 Summer Olympics
Universiade medalists in gymnastics
Universiade gold medalists for Romania
20th-century Romanian people
21st-century Romanian people